Qareh Chenaq (also Romanized as Qareh Chenāq) is a village in Gavdul-e Sharqi Rural District, in the Central District of Malekan County, East Azerbaijan Province, Iran. At the 2006 census, its population was 454, in 112 families.

References 

Populated places in Malekan County